Christo Potgieter (born 1 June 1987) is a South African professional squash player. He achieved his highest career PSA singles ranking of 136 in May 2015.

References

External links 
Profile at PSA
 

1987 births
Living people
South African male squash players
Sportspeople from Windhoek
21st-century South African people